Burleigh may refer to:

Places

Australia
Burleigh Heads, Queensland, a suburb of Gold Coast, Queensland
Burleigh Head National Park
Electoral district of Burleigh, Queensland, Australia

Canada
Burleigh Falls, Ontario

United Kingdom
Burleigh, Berkshire, Bracknell Forest, England
Burleigh, Gloucestershire, England
Burleigh, Perth and Kinross, Scotland
Burleigh Castle, is located at the above
Burleigh Hall, house near the site of the present Loughborough University
Burleigh Fields, house near Loughborough
Burleigh House, London

United States
Burleigh (Ellicott City, Maryland), listed on the NRHP in Maryland
Burleigh Township, Michigan
Burleigh, New Jersey
Burleigh (Concord, North Carolina), listed on the NRHP in North Carolina
Burleigh County, North Dakota
Menoken, North Dakota, also known as Burleigh or Burleigh Station

People with the surname
Averil Burleigh (1883–1949), British painter
Bennet Burleigh, British journalist 
Celia M. Burleigh, American activist for women's rights
Charles Burleigh (1810 – 1878), American orator and abolitionist
Edwin Chick Burleigh (1843-1916), American politician
Harry Burleigh, African-American composer
James Burleigh (1869-1917), English footballer
Michael Burleigh, British author and historian
Nina Burleigh, American author and journalist
Peter Burleigh (born 1942), American diplomat and South Asia specialist

Walter Atwood Burleigh (1820-1896), American physician
William Burleigh (1785–1827), American politician

Other uses
Burleigh Pottery, Stoke-on-Trent

See also
 Birley (disambiguation)
 Burley (disambiguation)
 Burghley (disambiguation)
 Berlei